The 2016–17 Wellington Phoenix FC season was the club's tenth season since its establishment in 2007. The club participated in the A-League for the tenth time, the FFA Cup for the third time, and fielded a reserves squad in the Stirling Sports Premiership for the third time.

Players

Squad information

From youth squad

Transfers in

Transfers out

Contracts extensions

Technical staff

Statistics

Squad statistics

|-
|colspan="24"|Players no longer at the club:

Pre-season and friendlies

Competitions

Overall

A-League

League table

Results summary

Results by round

Matches

FFA Cup

Stirling Sports Premiership

League table

Results summary

Results by round

Matches

References

External links
 Official Website

Wellington Phoenix
Wellington Phoenix FC seasons